Gjorče Petrov Stadium is a multi-use stadium in Skopje, North Macedonia. It is currently used mostly for football matches and is the home of FK Makedonija Gjorče Petrov. The stadium seats 3,000 people.

References

External links
Fotos Gjorče Petrov Stadion  
Macedonian Football 
Football Federation of Macedonia 

Football venues in North Macedonia
FK Makedonija Gjorče Petrov
Sport in Skopje